Edward Lexy (18 February 1897, in London – 31 January 1970, in Dublin) was a British actor.  He was born Edward Little.

Career
He made his London stage début in 1936, and his first film the following year. His film roles were a mixture of substantial supporting parts and minor bit parts. He retired in 1958.

Selected filmography

 Action for Slander (1937) - Minor Role (uncredited)
 Mademoiselle Docteur (1937) - (uncredited)
 Farewell Again (1937) - Sgt. Brough
 Knight Without Armour (1937) - Minor Role (uncredited)
 Smash and Grab (1937) - Inspector McInerney
 Under Secret Orders (1937) - Carr's Orderly
 The Green Cockatoo (1937) - (uncredited)
 South Riding (1938) - Mr. Holly
 The Divorce of Lady X (1938) - Peters - Club Attendant (uncredited)
 Second Best Bed (1938) - Murdock
 The Drum (1938) - Sgt. Major Kernel (uncredited)
 The Terror (1938) - Inspector Dobie
 Kate Plus Ten (1938) - Sergeant
 This Man Is News (1938) - Inspector Hollis
 Sixty Glorious Years (1938) - Dorset Soldier in Crimea (uncredited)
 Sidewalks of London (1938) - Mr. Such
 Night Journey (1938) - Milstone Mike
 Many Tanks Mr. Atkins (1938) - Sgt. Butterworth
 The Outsider (1939)
 The Gang's All Here (1939) - (uncredited)
 Too Dangerous to Live (1939) - Inspector Cardby
 This Man in Paris (1939) - Inspector Holly
 Traitor Spy (1939) - Det. Insp. William Barnard
 Laugh It Off (1940) - Sgt. Maj. Slaughter
 The Proud Valley (1940) - Commissionaire
 The Spider (1940) - Inspector Horridge
 Mrs. Pym of Scotland Yard (1940) - Det.-Inspector Shott
 Convoy (1940) - Merchantman Skipper
 Spare a Copper (1940) - Night Watchman
 Old Bill and Son (1941) - Soldier (uncredited)
 Medal for the General (1944) - Minor Role (uncredited)
 Piccadilly Incident (1946) - (uncredited)
 A Girl in a Million (1946) - Policeman
 School for Secrets (1946) - Sir Desmond Prosser
 Temptation Harbour (1947) - Stationmaster (uncredited)
 Captain Boycott (1947) - Sgt. Dempsey
 While I Live (1947) - Selby
 The Ghosts of Berkeley Square (1947) - Brigadier (uncredited)
 The Mark of Cain (1947) - Lord Rochford
 Blanche Fury (1948) - Col. Jenkins
 Good-Time Girl (1948) - Mr. Morgan
 My Brother's Keeper (1948) - Jess the Station Master (uncredited)
 The Winslow Boy (1948) - 1st. Elderly Member - Smoking Room
 Bonnie Prince Charlie (1948) - Lachlan (uncredited)
 It's Not Cricket (1949) - Brigadier Falcon
 For Them That Trespass (1949) - Second Prison Warden
 Children of Chance (1949) - Doctor
 Golden Arrow (1949) - The Colonel
 The Twenty Questions Murder Mystery (1950) - Det. Insp. Charlton
 Smart Alec (1951) - Inspector Ashley
 Cloudburst (1951) - Cardew
 The Lady with a Lamp (1951)
 Night Was Our Friend (1951) - Arthur Glanville
 The Happy Family (1952) - Alderman
 You're Only Young Twice (1952) - Lord Carshennie
 Miss Robin Hood (1952) - Wilson
 The Golden Link (1954) - Maj. Grey
 Orders Are Orders (1954) - Capt. Ledger
 Captain Lightfoot (1955) - Army general (uncredited)
 Where There's a Will (1955) - Mafeking Brewer
 The March Hare (1956) - (uncredited)
 Up in the World (1956) - Detective Superintendent
 The Rising of the Moon (1957) - Quartermaster Sergeant (3rd Episode)
 The Story of Esther Costello (1957) - Fourth Man in Irish Pub (uncredited)
 The Man Who Wouldn't Talk (1958) - Hobbs (final film role)

References

External links

1897 births
1970 deaths
English male film actors
English male stage actors
Male actors from London
20th-century English male actors